The Fox River is a  tributary of the Illinois River, flowing from southeastern Wisconsin to Ottawa, Illinois in the United States. The Wisconsin section was known as the Pishtaka River in the 19th century. There is another Fox River in Wisconsin that flows through Lake Winnebago into Green Bay. There are also two other "Fox Rivers" in southern Illinois: the Fox River (Little Wabash tributary) and a smaller "Fox River" that joins the Wabash River near New Harmony, Indiana.

The Fox River watershed encompasses 1720 square miles in Illinois and 938 square miles in Wisconsin.

Wisconsin

A major dam in Waterford forms a  navigable waterway which is one of the busiest in southeastern Wisconsin. The river is generally navigable from the Iron Bridge (now a concrete bridge) in Tichigan, Wisconsin (just south of Big Bend) down to the dam. The river connects several small lakes in this section, and one large lake, Tichigan Lake and one smaller lake, Buena Lake. The entire area including connected lakes and the Fox are often referred to as Tichigan Lake.

At the southern end of this section, Foxwood Isle separates the main dam to its west and a spillway to the east.

A small dam is present just a few miles south in downtown Rochester. The river then flows unobstructed through Burlington, where it joins the White River, and on to Wilmot. This is a popular and picturesque day-canoe trip never straying far from the road, but often just out of sight of it.

Flooding is common on this section of the river, especially near Wheatland to the border.

The Fox River watershed encompasses 938 square miles in Wisconsin.

Illinois

The river enters Illinois where it widens into a large area of interconnected lakes known as the Chain O'Lakes. Fox Lake is the largest village in this area. Illinois towns and communities that are on the Fox River include (from north to south): Fox Lake, Johnsburg, McHenry, Holiday Hills, Island Lake, Burtons Bridge, Port Barrington, Cary, Fox River Grove, Algonquin, Carpentersville, West Dundee, East Dundee, Elgin, South Elgin, St. Charles, Geneva, Batavia, North Aurora, Aurora, Montgomery, Oswego, Yorkville, Plano, Millington, Sheridan and Ottawa. Collectively, the area surrounding the Fox River is known as the Fox Valley. Around 1 million people live in this area.

Native American tribes that lived near the Fox River included the Potawatomi, Sac, and Fox tribes.

The Fox River has 15 dams, including McHenry Dam, which raises the river slightly to maintain depth in the Chain O'Lakes in northern Illinois, the Montgomery Dam and the Dayton Dam, a hydroelectric dam near Ottawa. In the winter, bald eagles can be found nesting along the banks.

Early in the history of Illinois, the Fox River provided water for the Illinois and Michigan Canal via a feeder canal, allowing the canal to pass over the Fox River on an aqueduct.

The Fox River watershed encompasses 1720 square miles in Illinois.

See also
 List of rivers of Illinois
 List of rivers of Wisconsin
 Fox River Trail (Illinois)
 Tri-Cities, Illinois
 James F. Phillips

References

External links

 Wisconsin Dept. of Natural Resources
 Watershed - Lower Fox River - Illinois (FX02)
 Watershed - Middle Fox River - Illinois (FX04)
 Watershed - Upper Fox River - Illinois (FX07)
 Fox River Paddling/Fishing page
 Friends of the Fox River
 Fox River Ecosystem Partnership (IL)
 Fox River CAUSE (WI)
 Southeast Fox River Partnership (WI)

Algonquin, Illinois
Elgin, Illinois
Rivers of Kane County, Illinois
Rivers of Kendall County, Illinois
Rivers of Kenosha County, Wisconsin
Rivers of Lake County, Illinois
Rivers of LaSalle County, Illinois
Rivers of McHenry County, Illinois
Rivers of Racine County, Wisconsin
Rivers of Waukesha County, Wisconsin
Rivers of Illinois
Rivers of Wisconsin
Tributaries of the Illinois River